= Phlashing =

Phlashing may refer to:

- A permanent denial-of-service attack, which is a denial-of-service attack that damages a device so its hardware would need to be replaced for it to be usable
- A kind of website forgery in phishing that involves the creation of a fake website, based on Adobe Flash to avoid detection by anti-phishing tools
